In the Hindu epic Mahabharata, Babruvahana is the son of Arjuna, a Pandava prince, and Chitrangada, the princess of Manipura (Mahabharata). Babruvahana was adopted as the heir of Manipura by his maternal grandfather, Chitravahana, and later reigned at the kingdom.

Legend

Birth 
Manipura was a kingdom in Eastern India, which was ruled by a king named Chitravahana. He had a daughter named Chitrangada and for multiple generations, the dynasty did not have more than one heir. Since Chitravahana did not have any other heir, he trained Chitrangada in warfare and rule. Chitrangada was well-versed in warfare and acquired the skills to protect the people of her land. The account is described in Rabindranath Tagore's play Chitra, where Tagore depicts Chitrangada as a warrior dressed in male clothes. Arjuna fell in love with her on account of her honesty and courage. They had a son named Babruvahana, whom Chitrangada reared up after Arjuna left them.

Ashvamedha 
Mahabharata loses mention of Chitra and her kingdom for several chapters. On the other side, the Pandavas went through various ordeals and finally winning the war against the Kauravas. Yudhishthira became the king of Hastinapura. His mind was restless since he always felt bad about killing his own kith and kin during the war. On the advice of sages, he conducted Ashvamedha yagna, where a decorated horse would be sent across the kingdom and wherever it goes unopposed, the land would be acquired by the king who sent it. Arjuna was tasked to take care of the horse. When Arjuna went to Manipura with the wandering sacrificial horse of the Ashvamedha, Babruvahana captured the horse, which, by tradition, meant war against the Pandavas. Arjuna tried to persuade Babruvahana to leave the horse as there was no enmity between Manipura and Hastinapura. Babruvanahana agreed with Arjuna, but informed him that he wished to kill Arjuna for his gurudakshina.

Arjuna, reluctant to fight a young boy, left and informed a small troop of his army to convince Babruvahana to give the horse back. Babruvahana defeated the army. He also defeated Bhima, and killed Vrishaketu. Knowing this, Arjuna grew enraged as Vrishaketu had been very dear to him, as he had been his elder brother Karna's son, and took an oath to kill Babruvahana or immolate himself if he gets defeated. Arjuna fought with Babruvahana, and got the upper hand. Babruvahana defeated Arjuna, and killed him with a powerful astra. Repenting his deed after knowing Arjuna's identity, he was determined to kill himself, but he obtained from his stepmother, the Naga princess Ulupi, a gem called Nagamani, which restored Arjuna to life, with the help of Krishna. The Pandavas, Ulupi, Chitrangada, Babruvahana, Draupadi, and their armies returned to Hastinapura.

In popular culture
The story of Babruvahana has been made into films in Telugu in 1942 and 1964 and in Kannada in 1977. The 1964 Telugu film Babruvahana was written and directed by Samudrala Sr. and starred N. T. Rama Rao, S. Varalakshmi and Chalam.

It was made into two Hindi movies in consecutive years, Veer Babruvahan in 1951 by Nanabhai Bhatt starring Shashi Kapoor, S. N. Tripathi and Veer Arjun in 1952 starring Mahipal, Nirupa Roy, & Trilok Kapoor.

The Kannada language film, Babruvahana was written and directed by Hunsur Krishnamurthy and starred Rajkumar as Arjuna and Babruvahana in a dual role, B. Saroja Devi as Chitrāngadā, Kanchana as Ulupi and Jayamala as Subhadra.

Bibliography

 
 Laura Gibbs, PhD. Modern Languages MLLL-4993. Indian Epics.
 Dowson's Classical Dictionary of Hindu Mythology

References

External links

 Babhruvahana in Encyclopedia for Epics of Ancient India

Characters in the Mahabharata